Vlado Jovanovski (born 27 February 1967) is Macedonian actor. His film credits include principal roles in prominent Macedonian films such as Bal-Can-Can and Mirage.

Filmography
 Slovenski Orfej (1992) (TV)
 Svetlo sivo (1993)
 Makedonska saga (1993)
 Angeli na otpad (1995)
 Preku ezeroto (1997)
 Goodbye, 20th Century! (1998)
 Veta (2001)
 Dust (2001)
 The Great Water (2004)
 Mirage (2004)
 Bal-Can-Can (2005)
 The Secret Book (2006)
 Time of the Comet (2008)
 Kolona (2011)
 The Third Half (2012)
 To the Hilt (2014)
  Lazar  (2015)
 Osloboduvanje na Skopje (2016)
 Prespav (television series, 2016–2022)
 Ruganje so Hristos (2018)
 Snezana umira na krajot (2022)

References

External links
 
 
 Macedonian Cinema Information Center: Jovanovski Vlado

1967 births
Living people
People from Probištip
Macedonian male film actors